Zapusta may refer to the following places in Poland:
Zapusta, Lower Silesian Voivodeship (south-west Poland)
Zapusta, Masovian Voivodeship (east-central Poland)